Olaf Holetschek (born 12 July 1968) is a German former footballer.

References

External links

Olaf Holetschek on Fupa

1968 births
Living people
German footballers
East German footballers
FC Carl Zeiss Jena players
FC Hansa Rostock players
Chemnitzer FC players
Bundesliga players
2. Bundesliga players
Association football midfielders
People from Saalfeld
Footballers from Thuringia